Scaeosopha nigrimarginata is a species of moth of the family Cosmopterigidae. It is found in Brunei, China, Malaysia and Thailand.

The wingspan is 12.5–15.5 mm. The ground colour of the forewings is whitish-yellow, overlaid with black spots and patches. The hindwings are deep-grey.

Etymology
The species name refers to the fact that the forewings are covered with black scales from the fold to the dorsum and is derived from the Latin prefix nigr- (meaning black) and marginatus (meaning margin).

References

Moths described in 2012
Scaeosophinae